Noisey is a 2016 American television documentary series hosted by Zach Goldbaum. The series premiered on 2 March 2016 on Viceland as part of its new programming launch. The series explores music cultures around the world, while discovering the problems that come with youth and crime that is involved with music. The series was renewed for a second season in 2016.

The series was preceded by 2014's Noisey: Chiraq and 2015's Noisey: Atlanta, which were hosted by Thomas Morton.

Noisey: Chiraq (2014)

Noisey: Atlanta (2015)

Noisey (2016-2017)

Season 1 (2016)

Season 2 (2017)

References

External links 
 Official site

2016 American television series debuts
Viceland original programming
2010s American documentary television series